The Bismarck Bucks were an indoor American football team based in Bismarck, North Dakota. The team suspended operations in 2022.
The Bucks joined Champions Indoor Football (CIF) as an expansion team in 2016, and began play for the 2017 season. The team moved to the Indoor Football League (IFL) beginning with the 2019 season. The team plays its home games at the Bismarck Event Center in Bismarck.

The Bucks are the third indoor football team to play in Bismarck, following the Bismarck Blaze who played in the original Indoor Football League for its second and final season of 2000, as well as the Bismarck Roughriders who played in the National Indoor Football League from 2002 until 2003.

History
On September 28, 2016, it was announced that Bismarck had been granted a team in the CIF to begin play for the 2017 season and owned by the Sallberg family under the corporate name Dakota Pro Football LLC.  Richard Davis was announced as the team's first head coach and general manager, with former University of Mary wide receiver Elby Pope signed as the team's first player.

Following a name-the-team contest, the Bismarck Bucks name, logo and colors were announced on the November 1 episode of KXMB-TV news/talk program Good Day Dakota.

During the Bucks' second season, head coach and general manager Richard Davis was relieved of duties after several workplace grievances had been filed against him and his wife Judy Davis, another Bucks' employee. He was replaced by former Wichita Force and Bucks' offensive coordinator Paco Martinez on an interim basis.

On October 5, 2018, the Bucks announced that they had joined the Indoor Football League for the 2019 season, following the Quad City Steamwheelers from the CIF. At the beginning of the 2019 season, the majority ownership of Dakota Pro Football LLC was sold to BEK Communications by the Sallberg family.

Current roster

Season-by-season results

References

External links
 Official site

 
2016 establishments in North Dakota